Silvia Šuvadová (pronounced shuw-vah-daw-vah) (born 4 April 1973) is a Slovak actress.

She was born in Ružomberok and studied at Academy of Performing Arts in Bratislava. After finishing her studies she appeared in several theater plays. She worked as a presenter and played in TV ads and TV movies. In 2002 she moved to Los Angeles.

Filmography 
 1994: Na krásnom modrom Dunaji aka On the Beautiful Blue Danube (Kamila)
 1996: Kolja (Blanka)
 2001: Melting Glass (Katka)
 2004: Puppet Master vs Demonic Toys (Srgt. Jessica Russel)
 2005: From the Outside In (Snowflake)
 2006: Lords of the Underworld (Savannah)
 2006: The Fast and the Furious: Tokyo Drift (Russian model)
 2007: Behaving Badly (Vella)
 2007: Apparition-The Darkness (Natasha)
 2008: Ďáblova lest (Dr. Evita Bérová)
 2008: Starwatch (Commander Barbara Marcoux)
 2008: Polanski Unauthorized (Bulla Polanski)

External links 

 

1975 births
Living people
People from Ružomberok
Slovak actresses